Anticlimax reinaudi is a minute sea snail, a marine gastropod mollusc in the family Tornidae.

Description
Anticlimax reinaudi has a very small (<1.5 mm), depressed shell, formed by 3 whorls of rapid growth, separated by a scarcely marked suture. The ornamentation consists of spiral cords, ribs and axial striae. The shell aperture is quadrangular.

Distribution
This species is only known from Vanuatu. It was found North-East of Malo Island, at depths of 13 m, on sand and dead corals.

Etymology
This species is named after Guy Reinaud, President of Pro-Natura International, coorganiser with MNHN of the "Our Planet Reviewed" expeditions, during which the species was discovered in 2006.

References

 ,  (2014). The family Tornidae in the tropical Southwest Pacific: the genus Anticlimax, in Iberus, supplement (6). 

Tornidae
Gastropods described in 2014